Safet Gjici (born 30 April 1972 in Kukës) is an Albanian businessman who is the CEO of EuroGjici Security and Kevin Construction. He is also the president of Albanian Superliga football club FK Kukësi. He was the Socialist Party candidate in the municipality of Kamëz in the 2015 local elections, but he lost to the Democratic Party candidate Xhelal Mziu. He was subsequently elected in the 2019 mayoral election of Kukës and won.

References

1972 births
Albanian businesspeople
Living people
People from Kukës
People from Kamëz
University of Tirana alumni
Socialist Party of Albania politicians